Carrier is a PBS documentary television series about the six-month deployment of the United States Navy aircraft carrier  in 2005 from the United States to the Middle East and back. There are ten episodes, and the series is supplemented by a 90-minute companion documentary film called Another Day in Paradise.

Synopsis
Carrier follows the deployment, from May 7, 2005 to November 8, 2005, of the supercarrier USS Nimitz (commanded by then-Captain Ted N. Branch), along with Carrier Air Wing Eleven, from her home port at North Island in Coronado, California to the Persian Gulf during Operation Iraqi Freedom. This character-driven, dramatic non-fiction series includes extensive footage shot aboard as well as interviews with many of the crew about their various experiences, personal concerns and fears. During the deployment, the Nimitz makes stops in Pearl Harbor, Hong Kong, Guam, Kuala Lumpur, Bahrain, and Perth.

Production
The miniseries was produced by Icon Productions and Carrier Project, Inc. It was co-created by Mitchell Block and Maro Chermayeff, and directed by Chermayeff. The executive producers were Block and Chermayeff for Carrier Project, Inc. and Mel Gibson, Bruce Davey and Nancy Cotton, for Icon Productions.

Seventeen filmmakers, including producers Deborah Dickson and Jeff Dupre as well as field producers Matthew Akers, Michelle Smawley and Pamela Yates, shot 1,600 hours of footage to create the series. The series and its companion film were the first documentaries to ever be produced on a U.S. Naval warship on active duty over an entire mission. This was accomplished by David Kennedy (Captain, US Navy, Retired) and Block who spent two years obtaining permission to embed on the Nimitz. In 2008, the series was awarded the Emmy for Outstanding Cinematography Reality Programming by the Academy of Television Arts & Sciences in recognition of the work cinematographers Axel Baumann, Ulli Bonnekamp, Mark Brice, Robert Hanna, and Wolfgang Held did on the episode Rights of Passage.

Events
During filming in the Persian Gulf, Seaman Apprentice Robert D. Macrum of the escorting cruiser  fell overboard sometime during the night of September 12, 2005, or the early morning of September 13. Despite a five day search that covered a  area, Macrum, who was 22 and from Sugarland, Texas, was never found.

Episodes
A 26-minute preview of the series was aired by PBS on April 13, 2008.
The ten 60-minute episodes began airing on April 27, 2008 with two episodes being shown each night for five straight nights. All episodes were directed by Chermayeff.

Another Day In Paradise
This 90-minute film was created from the same pool of footage used for the series. It covers many of the same themes touched on in the series, but narrows the focus to three men: a pilot, a marine, and a sailor. Not only are all three connected by the fact that they are serving on board the same ship, they are all also struggling with various family issues and the different phases of fatherhood. The film was released in the U.S. on June 16, 2008 and was directed by Deborah Dickson.

Disc releases
Series
A 3-disc, 600-minute region 1 DVD version of the documentary was released by PBS on May 6, 2008. Special features include scene selection, the preview episode, deleted and extended scenes, closed captioning and 16:9 anamorphic widescreen.
Film
A 90-minute region A1 Blu-ray Disc version of Another Day In Paradise was released by PBS on March 10, 2009.

See also 
 Sailor, a similar documentary about the life on board  in the 1970s.

References

External links
 Official website for the miniseries
 

2008 American television series debuts
2008 American television series endings
2000s American documentary television series
Documentary films about military aviation
Documentary television series about aviation
Nimitz-class aircraft carriers
PBS original programming
Television series about the United States Navy